Our Lips Are Sealed is a 2000 direct-to-video film starring Mary-Kate and Ashley Olsen. The film was partly set and filmed in Sydney, Australia.

Plot
The family of twin sisters Maddie and Abby Parker are placed in the FBI's Witness Protection Program after they witness a robbery at the local museum, in which the priceless Neil Diamond is stolen. Unfortunately, Maddie and Abby have a problem with being blabbermouths; as a result, everywhere the Parkers are sent to live, the girls inadvertently end up revealing their witness status. The gang is led by a crime lord with the rather unfortunate surname of Hatchew ("Bless you!"), who will do anything to get his hands on the diamond, which the thieves slipped into Abby's shoulder bag during their escape from the crime scene; the gem ultimately ends up being set into her necklace.

The family travels everywhere in the United States, from Texas to a prairie town, and eventually has been moved to every geographic location around the world possible, with the single exception of Australia – thus the FBI (who by this time are getting absolutely fed up of having to constantly relocate the Parkers, and all because Maddie and Abby can't keep their mouths shut) send them to live in Sydney. The girls at first have much trouble, especially fitting in with peers. Two assassins named Mac and Sidney are sent after them after having discovered their location by breaking into the FBI office.  Maddie and Abby defeat Mac and Sidney by knocking them out, tying them to surfboards and putting clips in Sidney's hair, painting Mac's toenails and threatening to put pink and blue bikinis on them. After the twins manage to convince them to change sides; they leave after the girls lure Hatchew to Australia. He comes after them, manages to get the diamond and sets his thug on them. It looks like they are about to die, until Mac and Sidney return and defeat the thug, saving the girls. Hatchew nearly gets away on a seaplane, but Maddie and Abby stop him using a boomerang and he is arrested by Katie, an undercover FBI agent posing as a lifeguard. The Parkers are finally able to return home to the United States with half the reward money for capturing the thieves.

Cast
 Ashley Olsen as Abby Parker
 Mary-Kate Olsen as Maddie Parker
 Jim Meskimen as Rick Parker
 Tamara Clatterbuck as Teri Parker
 Robert Miano as Hatchew
 Jason Clarke as Mac
 Richard Carter as Sidney
 Jo Phillips as Katie
 Harold Hopkins as Shelby Shaw (Oakland resident)
 Ernie Hudson Jr. as Agent Banner
 Willie Garson as Agent Norm
 Jade Bronneberg as Victoria
 Ryan Clark as Pete
 Scott Swalwell as Avery
 Nina Schultz, Prudie Quigley as Sheila
 Chris Foy as Donny
 Daniel Wakefield as Ray
 Pete Callan as News reporter Milo
 Chris Stapley as Leonard
 Katie Fountain as Vanessa
 Randall Rapstine as Principal
 Marguerite MacIntyre as Teacher
 J. P. Manoux as Robber
 Kenneth Davitian as Thug #1 (pants on the ground)
 Douglas Fisher as Judge
 Garth Holcombe as Jake
 Brett Blewitt as Yacht steward
 Harry Dajill McKaykanalis, Michael Hodge as Henchmen
 Boomer as himself

References

External links
 Official site (archive February 22nd 2008)
 

2000 films
2000 direct-to-video films
2000 comedy films
Films set in Sydney
2000s English-language films
Warner Bros. direct-to-video films
Films about twin sisters
Films about witness protection
Films about the Federal Bureau of Investigation
Twins in fiction
Films directed by Craig Shapiro
2000s American films